Bouja'd (Moroccan Arabic: , :  pronunciation: Bjaɛd) is a small city in Khouribga Province , Béni Mellal-Khénifra, Morocco.
Postal Code : 25060.

The city is  a suffi spiritual town between the Arab tribes of Beni zemmour descendants of  Banu Hilal

Notable people 
Famous people originated from Boujad include Moroccan politicians Mohamed Cherkaoui, Habib El Malki,  Taieb Cherkaoui and  Lahcen Haddad. Painter Ahmed Cherkaoui. Film Maker Hakim Belabbes. Music artist Salah El Morsli Cherkaoui, Chafik Cherqaoui, [Diplomat] Novelist and poet Idriss Chaarani.  Also Israeli diplomat Yehuda Lancry, former Israeli defense minister Amir Peretz and Shaul Amor, mayor of Migdal HaEmek, a member of the Israeli parliament and Israel's ambassador to Belgium.

References

Populated places in Khouribga Province